Asthenotricha pycnoconia is a moth in the family Geometridae first described by Anthonie Johannes Theodorus Janse in 1933. It is found in Cameroon, Kenya, Malawi, South Africa, Tanzania and Uganda.

References

Moths described in 1933
Asthenotricha
Moths of Africa